Likelike (Miriam Likelike Kekāuluohi Keahelapalapa Kapili; January 13, 1851February 2, 1887) was a princess of the Hawaiian Kingdom and member of the reigning House of Kalākaua. She was born in Honolulu, on the island of Oʻahu. Likelike's parents were Analea Keohokālole and Caesar Kapaʻakea, and the family were members of the aliʻi class of the Hawaiian nobility. Before age six, she was raised on the island of Hawaii for her health. Likelike later returned to Honolulu, where she was educated by Roman Catholic and Congregationalist teachers in the city's girls' schools.

She married Scottish businessman Archibald Scott Cleghorn in 1870 and was the mother of Princess Kaʻiulani, the last heir to the throne before the 1893 overthrow of the Hawaiian Kingdom. Likelike was the first mistress of the ʻĀinahau estate, which became associated with her daughter. She was Governor of the island of Hawaii from 1879 to 1880 and was in the line of succession to the throne after her sister, Liliʻuokalani. Likelike died under mysterious circumstances in 1887, with rumors that she was malevolently "prayed" to death. She and her siblings are recognized by the Hawaiian Music Hall of Fame as Na Lani ʻEhā (The Heavenly Four) for their patronage and enrichment of Hawaii's musical culture and history.

Early life and family 
Likelike was born on January 13, 1851, in Honolulu on the island of Oʻahu, to Analea Keohokālole and Caesar Kapaʻakea. Her full name was Miriam Likelike Kekāuluohi Keahelapalapa Kapili. Two of her namesakes were Likelike (an earlier Hawaiian chiefess and wife of Kalanimoku) and Miriam Auhea Kekāuluohi, Kuhina Nui (premier) and the mother of King Lunalilo (r. 1873–74).

Her parents were political advisors to King Kamehameha III (r. 1825–54) and later to his successor, Kamehameha IV (r. 1855–64). Likelike's mother was the daughter of ʻAikanaka and Kamaʻeokalani, and her father was the son of Kamanawa II (half-brother of ʻAikanaka) and Kamokuiki. Their family belonged to the aliʻi class of Hawaiian nobility and were collateral relatives of the reigning House of Kamehameha, descended from the 18th-century aliʻi nui (supreme monarch) Keaweʻīkekahialiʻiokamoku. Likelike was descended from Keaweaheulu and Kameʻeiamoku, two of the five royal counselors of Kamehameha I (r. 1782–1819) during his conquest of the Hawaiian Kingdom. Kameʻeiamoku, her parents' grandfather, was depicted with his royal twin Kamanawa on the Hawaiian coat of arms.

The youngest daughter and penultimate child of a large family, her biological siblings included James Kaliokalani, David Kalākaua, Liliʻuokalani, Anna Kaʻiulani, Kaʻiminaʻauao, and William Pitt Leleiohoku II. They were hānai (adopted) by other family members. The Hawaiian custom of hānai is an informal form of adoption in extended families.
Because Likelike was not healthy as a child, she was sent to live in the dry climate of Kona on the island of Hawaii. The 1892 obituary of Hawaii Supreme Court Justice Lawrence McCully noted that he was her teacher while he resided in Kona. According to historian George Kanahele, she was raised in Hilo on the wetter windward side of the island of Hawaii: "Little is known about her early years".

The identities of Likelike's hānai parents are unknown. According to historian Sammy Amalu, Likelike was brought up in the household of Peleuli (daughter of High Chief Kalaʻimamahu, half-brother of Kamehameha I) with Peleuli's granddaughter Miriam Auhea Kekāuluohi Crowningburg, a second cousin of King Lunalilo.

Education 

At age six, Likelike returned permanently to Honolulu. She was initially educated at the Sacred Hearts Convent and School by the Roman Catholic sisters of the Congregation of the Sacred Hearts of Jesus and Mary. The sisters arrived in Hawaii in 1859, and established day and boarding schools for Hawaiian girls next to the Cathedral Basilica of Our Lady of Peace in Honolulu. The schools were the predecessor of the Sacred Hearts Academy in Kaimuki. Likelike was later educated by American Congregationalist missionary teacher Maria Ogden at the Makiki Family School, established in Honolulu in 1860 with the support of King Kamehameha IV and Queen Emma. Her last school was the Kawaiahaʻo Seminary for Girls; Likelike's teacher was Lydia Bingham, daughter of Hiram Bingham I (leader of the first group of American Protestant missionaries to introduce Christianity to the Hawaiian Islands). Her classmates at Kawaiahaʻo included Annie Palekaluhi Kaikioʻewa (sister of Edward Kamakau Lilikalani) and Lily Auld, also members of the Hawaiian nobility.

Likelike was particularly close to her elder sister, Liliʻuokalani, who was warm towards (and protective of) her younger sister. In a September 7, 1865 letter, Liliʻuokalani (who had married John Owen Dominis) advised Likelike about her education:

Betrothal to Albert Kūnuiākea

Likelike was betrothed around 1869 to Albert Kūnuiākea, an illegitimate son of King Kamehameha III and the hānai son of Queen Dowager Kalama. Contemporary sources noted, "Their betrothal [was] much desired by those in authority as well as the other chiefs". During the 1869 visit of Alfred, Duke of Edinburgh and the Galatea, Likelike's sister Liliʻuokalani entertained the British prince with a traditional Hawaiian lūʻau at her Waikiki residence of Hamohamo. Likelike accompanied Queen Dowager Kalama and Kūnuiākea on a carriage of state from Honolulu to Waikiki on the occasion of the festivities. The couple broke off the engagement soon afterwards, for unspecified reasons. Kūnuiākea married Mary Lonokahikini, widow of the Reverend Z. Poli, in 1878.

Marriage to Archibald Scott Cleghorn 

Likelike married Archibald Scott Cleghorn, a businessman from Scotland almost twice her age, on September 22, 1870; Cleghorn was 35, and Likelike was 19. They were married in an Anglican ceremony officiated by Reverend Charles George Williamson, rector of St. Andrew's Cathedral. The wedding was at Washington Place, her sister Liliʻuokalani's residence. Cleghorn had fathered daughters Rose, Helen and Annie with his part-Hawaiian mistress (Elizabeth Lapeka Pauahi Grimes) before the marriage, and Likelike accepted the children.

The couple initially lived in a mansion on Emma Street, the present-day site of The Pacific Club, in Honolulu. Likelike gave birth to their daughter, Kaʻiulani, on October 16, 1875. Liliʻuokalani wrote that Kaʻiulani "was at once recognized as the hope of the Hawaiian people, as the only direct heir by birth to the throne." The long-awaited future heir to the throne was christened by Bishop Alfred Willis at the pro-cathedral of St. Andrew's on December 25, 1875.  Princess Ruth Keʻelikōlani and the king and queen were her godparents. Keʻelikōlani gave  of her land in Waikīkī (outside Honolulu) to her goddaughter. The family sold their Honolulu property in 1878 and moved to the beachfront district of Waikīkī, where Cleghorn built a family estate which Likelike named ʻĀinahau (cool land).

Kaʻiulani was the couple's only child. Likelike had a miscarriage in June 1877 on a ship en route to San Francisco, California, and may have had another miscarriage after a fall from a horse before her final illness.

Like her sister Lydia's marriage to John Owen Dominis, her marriage to Cleghorn was bittersweet. Victorian gentlemen expected to be the lord of their castle, their servants, their children, and their wives. Hawaiian nobility (aliʻi), however, were raised to rule others. Cleghorn could be blustery and demanding; on several occasions, the princess returned to the island of Hawaii and refused to return until they reconciled.

Likelike was vivacious and well-liked, and her home was open to important people from all over the world. She had a reputation as a gracious hostess at her ʻĀinahau estate. Likelike was au courant with the latest fashions, ordering dresses and clothing from San Francisco and Paris. She was known be imperious and quick-tempered, once striking a groom with a whip for not keeping the carriage properly polished. Likelike was baptized and confirmed in the Anglican Church of Hawaii in 1882.

Public life
After his accession, Likelike's brother Kalākaua bestowed royal titles and ranks upon her and their siblings: sisters became Princess Lydia Kamakaʻeha Dominis (Liliʻuokalani) and Princess Miriam Likelike Cleghorn and their brother became Prince William Pitt Leleiohoku. The latter was also named heir to the Hawaiian throne, as Kalākaua and Queen Kapiʻolani had no children of their own.

After Leleiohoku's death on April 9, 1877, Kalākaua proclaimed Liliʻuokalani heir apparent to the throne. Likelike and her daughter were next in the line of succession. Kalākaua bestowed the title of Princess of the Kingdom on Likelike by letters patent on February 10, 1883, also recognizing other members of his family who been using their courtesy titles since 1873. She was ranked in precedence behind the king and queen, Queen Dowager Emma and Liliʻuokalani and her husband, John Owen Dominis, and ranked above her husband and their daughter Princess Kaʻiulani. Likelike participated in Kalākaua's coronation, nine years into his reign, on February 12, 1883. She wore "a robe of brocaded white satin trimmed with pearls and feathers" ordered from San Francisco, and was waited on by sisters Clara and Lizzie Coney.

The Cook Monument, an obelisk commemorating Captain James Cook's landing on the Hawaiian Islands, was unveiled in November 1874 at the place where he was killed. Great Britain and the United States were seen at the time seen as allies who prevented Russia from seizing the kingdom. On January 26, 1877, Likelike and Cleghorn deeded their land at the Cook Monument at Kealakekua Bay in trust to the British Commissioner to Hawaii James Hay Wodehouse and his subsequent heirs for one dollar "to keep and maintain" the monument. Although the deed names Likelike and her husband, its only signatory was Cleghorn's. Because of the deed's wording, Wodehouse and his heirs (not the British government) became owners of the land. The error was not discovered until 1939, when the Wodehouse estate conveyed the deed to the British government for $1.

Governorship 
Governor Samuel Kipi died in office on March 11, 1879. Likelike was appointed his successor on March 29, and held the position until September 2, 1880. Her first official meeting as governor was at the Hilo courthouse on May 31. The island of Hawaii was no stranger to a female governor, since Princess Keʻelikōlani (Kaʻiulani's godmother) had held the position from 1855 to 1874. During her tenure, Likelike visited all of the island's districts and had a special affinity for Kona and Hilo.
	
In April 1880, the legislature of the Kingdom appropriated an annual allowance of $8,000 (a $5,000 increase from her salary as governor) for Likelike "provided she resigns the office of Governess of Hawaii". She had resigned her position by September 1880, and Princess Victoria Kinoiki Kekaulike (Queen Kapiʻolani's younger sister) was appointed her successor on September 2 of that year. The 1882 legislative session increased her annual salary to $12,000 and appropriate $5,000 for her seven year-old daughter Princess Kaʻiulani.

Philanthropy 
Likelike was involved in a number of philanthropic projects. On February 19, 1874, she created and organized the Hui Hooulu a Hoola La Hui of Kalakaua I, a charity of which she was its first president. Organized one week after her brother's ascension to the throne, it took its name from his motto ("Hoʻoulu Lāhui"; "to increase, restore, re-establish and advance the lāhui [people]"). The organization provided assistance for the needy, including financial help, clothing, medical care or shelter, food, and family burials. Likelike helped her sister to found the Liliʻuokalani Educational Society, an organization "to interest the Hawaiian ladies in the proper training of young girls of their own race whose parents would be unable to give them advantages by which they would be prepared for the duties of life", in 1886. She led one division of the organization, and Liliʻuokalani led the other. It supported the education of Hawaiian girls at Likelike's alma mater, Kawaiahaʻo Seminary for Girls, and Kamehameha School. After Likelike's death, Liliʻuokalani assumed full leadership of the organization.

Travels to Australia and the United States 
Likelike traveled abroad three times during her marriage. She visited Auckland, Sydney and Melbourne from August to December 1871 with her husband on their extended honeymoon, and met colonial governors and officials. In 1877, mourning the death of her brother Leleiohoku, she traveled to San Francisco for her health and returned to Honolulu on the steamer Likelike on its first voyage between California and Hawaii. Likelike revisited San Francisco in 1884 with Hawaiian banker Charles Reed Bishop and Liliʻuokalani's hānai sister, Bernice Pauahi Bishop; Bernice was going to the city to undergo surgery for breast cancer, of which she later died. Their visit coincided with the arrival of Queen Marau, wife of King Pōmare V of Tahiti, who was en route to Paris. Before her death, Likelike was planning to travel to Monterey with Kaʻiulani for their health.

Death and state funeral 
She had been in failing health for months, but her doctors only advised fresh air and a change of scenery. Likelike became weaker, and was advised to get "more nourishment". In mid-January 1887, a large school of red āweoweo fish was seen off the coast of the island of Hawaii, an omen in native Hawaiian beliefs that foretold the death of a member of royalty. At 5:15 p.m. on February 2, 1887, Likelike died of unknown causes at age 36.

Rumors circulated in Hawaii's Euro-American (haole) community that she had died of fear due to superstition or had been "prayed" to death by a powerful kahuna ʻanāʻanā, or that she sacrificed her life to the goddess Pele to stop the 1887 eruption of Mauna Loa. According to her medical advisors, however, "If Princess Likelike had taken sufficient nourishment there was no reason why she should not have recovered strength."

According to Hawaiian legend, Likelike asked to see Kaʻiulani on her deathbed, and during her last moments, she prophesied that Kaʻiulani would leave Hawaii for a long time, never marry and never become queen. Kaʻiulani was educated in England from 1889 to 1897. She was declared heir apparent to the Hawaiian throne during the reign of her aunt, Queen Liliʻuokalani. After the 1893 overthrow of the Hawaiian Kingdom, Kaʻiulani traveled from London to Washington, D.C. and convinced U.S. President Grover Cleveland to attempt to restore the monarchy. Cleveland sent Commissioner James Henderson Blount to investigate the overthrow and try, unsuccessfully, to restore the queen. Kaʻiulani returned to Hawaii in 1897, and saw the annexation of the Hawaiian Islands by the United States on August 12, 1898. She died of rheumatism at ʻĀinahau on March 6, 1899.

Funeral and burial 

Native Hawaiian protocol dictated that the body of an aliʻi could only be moved after midnight following death, and had to be interred on the sabbath. She was placed on a catafalque in the throne room, where she lay in state until the following afternoon. The princess was covered by a satin shroud, with kāhili wavers on both sides. A private viewing was provided for the royal family and government dignitaries before a public viewing, and government offices were closed. Likelike's funeral was weeks later, after her body was embalmed and details of the procession were finalized.

The funeral was held in the throne room on Sunday, February 27. The kāhili bearers had waved continuously since February 3, and "no hula had marred the solemnity". Bishop Willis and Rev. Alexander Macintosh conducted daily services during the 24-day period. A large funeral procession followed, whose participants were mostly native Hawaiian. Likelike was buried in the Royal Mausoleum at Mauna ʻAla. Her coffin was placed at the head of the main mausoleum, in the center of a row of other coffins. Photographers and a sketch artist recorded the event.

Likelike's funeral cost $30,337.54 in Hawaiian dollars, prompting an investigation. About $22,000 of the total cost was for clothing the over 1,600 mourners. The committee recommended that the legislature approve a payment of $10,772.71, with the remainder to be paid by the trustees of the king's estate. The previous state funeral, for Queen Dowager Emma in 1885, cost $5,965.98; four years later, the state funeral of Kalākaua had greater financial oversight and cost $21,442.

In a June 24, 1910 ceremony officiated by Likelike's sister, Queen Liliʻuokalani, the remains of the deceased members of the Kalākaua dynasty were transferred to the underground Kalākaua Crypt after the main mausoleum was converted into a chapel. The niche bearing her remains, inscribed "H.R.H. Like Like | Born 1835–Died 1887", is next to the niches for her daughter Kaʻiulani and Cleghorn (who died shortly after the crypt was completed).

Musical compositions 

Likelike was taught music from childhood and learned to play piano, guitar and ukulele. An early part of the entourage of her sister, Liliʻuokalani, music defined their social life in the royal circle. In 1877, Liliʻuokalani composed Aloha ʻOe about the parting of two lovers in Maunawili; later historians have speculated that the song was about Likelike and an unknown man. Sanoe (another royal composition by Likelike's lady-in-waiting, Elizabeth Keawepoʻoʻole Sumner, and Liliʻuokalani) alludes to a secret love affair between an unknown man and a married woman at the royal court.

The two sisters founded a royal choral group, Hui Himeni Kaohuokalani (the Kaohuokalani Singing Club or Kaohuokalani Singing Association), early in their brother's reign. They participated in choral competitions with groups founded by their brothers. The group composed a number of kanikau (dirges) for the funeral of Princess Likelike in 1887, including songs by Liliʻuokalani and ladies-in-waiting Kapoli Kamakau and Eliza Wood Holt. Kamakau composed "Imi Ia Ka Lani" ("The Heavenly One Is Sought") as a tribute to Likelike at her death.

Few of Likelike's compositions survive, compared to those of her siblings. She signed many of her mele (songs) with the name "Kapili". Notable surviving compositions include "ʻÂinahau" (an ode to her home, where she composed most of her works) and "Kuʻu Ipo Ika Heʻe Pue One" ("My Sweetheart"), also known as "Ka ʻOwē A Ke Kai", which Kanahele said was "written for a sweetheart she never married". Other songs included "Maikaʻi Waipiʻo" ("Beautiful Waipiʻo", her daughter's favorite), "ʻAia Hiki Mai" and "Lei Ohaoha".

Likelike and her siblings are recognized by the Hawaiian Music Hall of Fame as Na Lani ʻEhā (The Heavenly Four) for their patronage and enrichment of Hawaii's musical culture and history. According to Kanahele, Likelike is the least recognized of the four royals:

Memorials and namesakes 
Likelike Street, near the original ʻIolani Palace, was named in honor of the princess in 1874. After the construction of the second palace on the same spot, Likelike Gate (which faced Likelike Street) was named in her honor and used as a private entrance for members of the royal family.

The Hawaiian postal service issued one-cent, blue-on-green postage stamps with a portrait of Likelike in 1882. They were in use until 1894.

The steamship Likelike, named for the princess, was launched on August 2, 1877 from San Francisco and arrived in Honolulu on August 14. Sold to businessman Samuel Gardner Wilder and used for inter-island transport, it was wrecked in 1897 off the coast of Keawe‘ula on the island of Hawaii.

A window at St. Andrew's Cathedral in Honolulu was dedicated to Likelike by her daughter, Kaʻiulani.
Several places in Hawaii are named after the princess, including Likelike Highway and Likelike Elementary School.

Ancestry

Notes

References

Bibliography

Books and journals

Newspapers and online sources

External links 

 Hawaiian Princess Miriam Likelike, Mother of Crown Princess Kaiulani

Hawaiian songwriters
1851 births
1887 deaths
Royalty of the Hawaiian Kingdom
House of Kalākaua
Hawaiian princesses
Burials at the Royal Mausoleum (Mauna ʻAla)
Governors of Hawaii (island)
Native Hawaiian women in politics
Recipients of the Royal Order of Kalākaua
Hawaiian adoptees (hānai)
19th-century American politicians
Hawaiian Kingdom Anglicans